Darnell L. Sanders (born March 16, 1979) is a former American football tight end in the National Football League. He played in 36 games (23 starts) at Ohio State University and finished with 42 catches for 474 yards and nine touchdowns.  He was drafted in the 2002 NFL Draft by the Cleveland Browns. He also played for the Atlanta Falcons.

References

1979 births
Living people
Players of American football from Cleveland
American football tight ends
Ohio State Buckeyes football players
Cleveland Browns players
Atlanta Falcons players